In mathematics, the permutohedron of order n is an (n − 1)-dimensional polytope embedded in an n-dimensional space. Its vertex coordinates (labels) are the permutations of the first n natural numbers. The edges identify the shortest possible paths (sets of transpositions) that connect two vertices (permutations). Two permutations connected by an edge differ in only two places (one transposition), and the numbers on these places are neighbors (differ in value by 1).

The image on the right shows the permutohedron of order 4, which is the truncated octahedron. Its vertices are the 24 permutations of (1, 2, 3, 4). Parallel edges have the same edge color. The 6 edge colors correspond to the 6 possible transpositions of 4 elements, i.e. they indicate in which two places the connected permutations differ. (E.g. red edges connect permutations that differ in the last two places.)

History
They describe the word as barbaric, but easy to remember, and submit it to the criticism of their readers.

The alternative spelling permutahedron is sometimes also used. Permutohedra are sometimes called permutation polytopes, but this terminology is also used for the related Birkhoff polytope, defined as the convex hull of permutation matrices. More generally,  uses that term for any polytope whose vertices have a bijection with the permutations of some set.

Vertices, edges, and facets

The permutohedron of order  has  vertices, each of which is adjacent to  others.

Two connected vertices differ by swapping two coordinates, whose values differ by 1. The pair of swapped places corresponds to the direction of the edge.
The values 2 and 3 differ by 1. All blue edges correspond to swaps of coordinates on the first two places.)

So the number of all faces is the -th ordered Bell number.
A face of dimension  corresponds to an ordering with  equivalence classes.

|}

The number of faces of dimension  in the permutohedron of order  is given by the triangle  :
          with  representing the Stirling numbers of the second kind
It is shown on the right together with its row sums, the ordered Bell numbers.

Other properties

The permutohedron is vertex-transitive: the symmetric group Sn acts on the permutohedron by permutation of coordinates.

The permutohedron is a zonotope; a translated copy of the permutohedron can be generated as the Minkowski sum of the n(n − 1)/2 line segments that connect the pairs of the standard basis vectors.

The vertices and edges of the permutohedron are isomorphic to one of the Cayley graphs of the symmetric group, namely the one generated by the transpositions that swap consecutive elements. The vertices of the Cayley graph are the inverse permutations of those in the permutohedron. The image on the right shows the Cayley graph of S4.

This Cayley graph is Hamiltonian; a Hamiltonian cycle may be found by the Steinhaus–Johnson–Trotter algorithm.

Tessellation of the space 

The permutohedron of order n lies entirely in the -dimensional hyperplane consisting of all points whose coordinates sum to the number

 1 + 2 + ... + n = n(n + 1)/2.

Moreover, this hyperplane can be tiled by infinitely many translated copies of the permutohedron. Each of them differs from the basic permutohedron by an element of a certain (n − 1)-dimensional lattice, which consists of the n-tuples of integers that sum to zero and whose residues (modulo n) are all equal:

 x1 + x2 + ... + xn = 0
 x1 ≡ x2 ≡ ... ≡ xn (mod n).

This is the lattice , the dual lattice of the root lattice . Accordingly, this lattice is sometimes called the permutohedral lattice.

Thus, the permutohedron of order 4 shown above tiles the 3-dimensional space by translation. Here the 3-dimensional space is the affine subspace of the 4-dimensional space R4 with coordinates x, y, z, w that consists of the 4-tuples of real numbers whose sum is 10,

 x + y + z + w = 10.

One easily checks that for each of the following four vectors,

 (1,1,1,−3), (1,1,−3,1), (1,−3,1,1) and (−3,1,1,1),

the sum of the coordinates is zero and all coordinates are congruent to 1 (mod 4). Any three of these vectors generate the translation lattice.

The tessellations formed in this way from the order-2, order-3, and order-4 permutohedra, respectively, are the apeirogon, the regular hexagonal tiling, and the bitruncated cubic honeycomb. The dual tessellations contain all simplex facets, although they are not regular polytopes beyond order-3.

Examples

See also 

 Associahedron
 Cyclohedron
 Permutoassociahedron

Notes

References

.
.
.
 .
 Googlebook, 370–381 Also online on the KNAW Digital Library at http://www.dwc.knaw.nl/toegangen/digital-library-knaw/?pagetype=publDetail&pId=PU00011495 
.
.

Further reading
.

External links

Permutations
Polytopes